"I'll Be Your Mirror" is a song by The Velvet Underground

I'll Be Your Mirror may also refer to:

 I'll Be Your Mirror - A series of live music events from the organisation behind All Tomorrow's Parties.
 I'll Be Your Mirror, a book of selected Andy Warhol interviews.
 "I'll Be Your Mirror" (Once Upon a Time), an episode of the sixth season of Once Upon a Time
 I'll Be Your Mirror: A Tribute to The Velvet Underground & Nico, 2021 compilation album